Hero is a 2022 South Korean musical drama film directed by Yoon Je-kyoon, starring Jung Sung-hwa, Kim Go-eun, and Na Moon-hee. Based on the hit stage musical of the same name, the film will follow the true story of An Jung-geun, a Korean-independence activist who assassinated Itō Hirobumi, the first Prime Minister of Japan and Resident-General of Korea in 1909. It was released theatrically on December 21, 2022.

Cast 
 Jung Sung-hwa as An Jung-geun  
 Kim Go-eun as Seol-hee
 Na Moon-hee as Cho Maria
 Jo Jae-yoon as Woo Deok-soon
 Bae Jung-nam as Cho Do-seon
 Lee Hyun-woo as Yoo Dong-ha
 Park Jin-joo as Ma Jin-joo
 Jo Woo-jin as Ma Do-sik  
 Lee Il-hwa as Empress Myeongseong
 Kim Sung-rak as Ito Hirobumi
 Jang Young-nam as Lady Kim Ah-ryeo
 Kim Joong-hee as Wada

Production 
Principal photography began on September 10, 2019, with South Korea and Latvia as the main shooting location. The filming wrapped on December 15, 2019.

Release 
The first poster and teaser trailer debuted on March 26, 2020. It was slated to release theatrically in July 2020, but due to COVID-19 Pandemic its release was delayed.

Philanthropy 
On December 15, 2022, Film Hero donated 8.15 million won to 815 Run to renovate the homes of the children of freedom fighters.

Accolades

References

External links
 
 
 

2020s Korean-language films
South Korean biographical drama films
South Korean historical drama films
South Korean historical musical films
South Korean musical drama films
Films about assassinations
Films about capital punishment
Films about the Korean independence movement
Films set in 1907
Films set in 1908
Films set in 1909
Films set in 1910
Films set in Korea under Japanese rule
Films set in Liaoning
Films set in Jilin
Films set in Seoul
Films set in Tokyo
Films set in Harbin
Films set in Vladivostok
Films shot in Latvia
Films shot in Seoul
Films based on musicals
Films postponed due to the COVID-19 pandemic
An Jung-geun